Geraldine Savage (born 1950s) is an Irish Paralympic equestrian. She won a bronze medal in the 2012 Summer Paralympics.

Career 
She competed at the 2011 European Para Equestrian Championships.

At the 2012 Summer Paralympics, she won a bronze medal in Equestrian Team. She competed in Dressage - Championship Grade Ia, and Dressage - Freestyle Grade Ia.

References 

Paralympic bronze medalists for Ireland
Irish equestrians
1950s births
Living people
Equestrians at the 2012 Summer Paralympics
Medalists at the 2012 Summer Paralympics